Overtime is the second extended play recorded by American electronic music group Cash Cash released on October 29, 2013 through Big Beat. The EP was made available for streaming exclusively via Dancing Astronaut on October 28, 2013.

Background
Speaking about the new sound for the EP, member Jean Paul Makhlouf said;

To support the EP, the group announced a North American tour that began in October 2013.

Singles
"Overtime" was released in November 26, 2012 as the first single from the EP. It was released for a free download on SoundCloud before being released digitally on streaming services on October 8, 2013. The song peaked at number 39 on the Billboard Dance/Electronic Songs chart. The song also entered the Billboard Dance/Electronic Streaming Songs chart at number 25 in 2019, 7 years after its initial release. "Take Me Home" was released on July 15, 2013 as the second single from the EP and features American singer-songwriter Bebe Rexha. The song peaked at number 57 on the Billboard Hot 100 and sold 488,000 downloads in the US to date according to Nielsen SoundScan. The song was certified platinum by RIAA in June 2017.

Critical reception
Complex calls the EP, "a fun, upbeat, blended sound, with strong vocal tracks, pop melodies, and electro-house stomping beats that come together in a fluid and enjoyable collection of songs." Eric Zwilling of Dancing Astronaut stated that the group showcases, "the musicianship of the group through careful manipulation and sampling of the vocals." He also praised songs such as "Take Me Home" and "Kiss the Sky".

Overtime EP Remixes
The Overtime EP Remixes is a digital exclusive. It was released on June 17, 2014 and features three remixes of "Overtime", and a remix of "Satellites" and "Take Me Home".

Track listing

Personnel
Credits for Overtime adapted from AllMusic. 
 Cash Cash - primary artist
 Kerli - featured artist
 Bebe Rexha - featured artist

Charts

References

2013 EPs
Cash Cash albums